Manuel de la Concha was a Spanish commissioned officer of the military forces under Félix María Calleja del Rey Bruder Losada Campaño y Montero de Espinosa, Viceroy of New Spain;
his rank was Colonel. In 1815 Manuel de la Concha apprehended insurgent General José María Morelos y Pavón.

See also 
Battle of Azcapotzalco
Battle of Temalaca
Manuel de Flores, Inquisitor
Matías Carranco
Documentos Morelos

References

External links
The Last Days of José María Morelos. McKeehan, Wallace L.; ’’’(Accessed January 10, 2013) Reference: Paragraph III. ”Colonel Manuel de la Concha”; (Manuel de la Concha to Calleja, Tepecuacuileo, November 3.3, 1815, Morelos documentos, II, 289-90.) Paragraph IV. “Colonel Concha”; (Bustamante, Cuadro histórico, III, 219-20). Paragraph VI.  “Concha, (Calleja to Concha, Mexico City, November 19, 1815, ibid., p. 304). Paragraph XX.  (Calleja to Concha, November 27, 1815, Morelos documentos, II, 327-30). Paragraph XXIII. “Manuel de la Concha”.

Bibliography
 Timmons, Wilbert H.; Morelos: Priest, Soldier, Statesman of Mexico. Texas Western College Press; First Edition (1963). ASIN B0007IU0F0.

Spanish colonels
People of New Spain
People of the Mexican War of Independence
19th-century Spanish military personnel
Year of birth missing
Year of death missing